Billing descriptor is the way a company's name appears on a credit card statement and is set up when the merchant account is established. It is used by the credit card customer to identify who a payment was made to on a particular transaction.

The name used is typically the trading name of the business rather than the legal name so that it can be easily recognised by the customer. The billing descriptor may also be made up of a soft or dynamic descriptor that includes the name of the service provided, this is often used by large companies that provide many services and where the brand of the service is more familiar than the company name.

Selecting a clear billing descriptor is important for a merchant to avoid a chargeback when the credit card customer does not recognise the name on the transaction.

Static descriptors
If the company offers a single service or product, this descriptor would be sufficient. (ex. ZXC Services&Products 800-123-4567)

Dynamic descriptors
There are dynamic descriptors as well which allow the description field in the cardholder's statement to be modified to include more detailed information of the transaction. Often the merchant's name is shortened to three letters, followed by an asterisk (*), followed by a short description of the service or product that the business provides. This field typically has a limit of 25 characters including the phone number (ex. ZXC* Site Access 800-123-4567)

See also
 Merchant services
 Credit card terminal
 Credit card fraud
 Chargeback insurance

References

Credit card terminology